List of 2012 murders in the United States

References

Murders, United States
Murders, 2012
Murders, 2012
Murders, 2012
2012 in United States